Schrems is a town in the district of Gmünd in Lower Austria, Austria.

Notable people
 

Josef Allram (1860–1941), writer and teacher

References

Cities and towns in Gmünd District
Bohemian Massif